Yener is a Turkish name. Notable people with the name include:

Surname:
Aylin Yener, American engineer
Bulent Yener, American engineer
Hande Yener (born 1973), Turkish singer
K. Aslihan Yener, archaeologist of Turkish descent whose work on Bronze Age tin mines in Anatolia revealed a new possible source of tin

Given name:
Yener Karahanoğlu (born 1946), high-ranking Turkish naval officer and the 21st Commander of the Turkish Navy

See also
, a Turkish steamship in service 1956–59

Turkish-language surnames
Turkish masculine given names